Maria Ortiz may refer to:

 Maria Ortiz (1603–1646), Brazilian heroine, famous for her defense of Espírito Santo
 María Inés Ortiz (1967–2007), U.S. Army nurse
 Paula Ortiz (field hockey) (María Paula Ortiz, born 1997), Argentinian field hockey player
 María Ortiz (footballer), Spanish footballer